This is a list of torpedo bomber aircraft, designed or adapted to carry a primary weapon load of one or more aerial torpedoes in an anti-shipping role. It does not include types equipped for the more general anti-submarine warfare (ASW) role.


Torpedo bombers

|-
| AD Seaplane Type 1000 || UK ||  || 1916 || Prototype || 2 || 
|-
| Aeromarine 700 || US ||  || 1917 || Prototype || 2 || 
|-
| Aichi AB-8 || Japan ||  || 1933 || Prototype || 1 || 
|-
| Aichi B7A Grace || Japan ||  || 1942 || Out of service || 114 || 
|-
| Albatros W.3 || Germany ||  || 1916 || Prototype || 1 || 
|-
| Albatros W.5 || Germany ||  || 1916 || Out of service || 5 || 
|-
| Arado Ar 95 || Germany ||  || 1936 || Out of service || 42 || 
|-
| Arado Ar 195 || Germany ||  || 1937 || Out of service || 3 || 
|-
| Armstrong Whitworth A.W.19 || UK ||  || 1934 || Prototype || 1 || 
|-
| Avro 557 Ava || UK ||  || 1924 || Prototype || 2 || 
|-
| Avro 571 Buffalo || UK ||  || 1926 || Prototype || 1 || 
|-
| Beardmore W.B.VI || UK ||  ||N/A || Design only || 0 || 
|-
| Blackburn B-3 || UK ||  || 1932 || Prototype || 2 || 
|-
| Blackburn B-7 || UK ||  || 1934 || Prototype || 1 || 
|-
| Blackburn Baffin || UK ||  || 1932 || Out of service || 97 || 
|-
| Blackburn Beagle || UK ||  || 1928 || Prototype || 1 || 
|-
| Blackburn Blackburd || UK ||  || 1918 || Prototype || 3 || 
|-
| Blackburn Botha || UK ||  || 1938 || Out of service || 580 || 
|-
| Blackburn Cubaroo || UK ||  || 1924 || Prototype || 2 || 
|-
| Blackburn Dart || UK ||  || 1921 || Out of service || 118 || 
|-
| Blackburn Firebrand || UK ||  || 1942 || Out of service || 220 || 
|-
| Blackburn Firecrest || UK ||  || 1947 || Prototype || 3 || 
|-
| Blackburn G.P. || UK ||  || 1916 || Prototype || 2 || 
|-
| Blackburn Kangaroo || UK ||  || 1918 || Out of service || 20 || 
|-
| Blackburn Ripon || UK ||  || 1926 || Out of service || 96 || 
|-
| Blackburn Shark || UK ||  || 1933 || Out of service || 269 || 
|-
| Blackburn Swift || UK ||  || 1921 || Prototype || 1 || 
|-
| Blackburn Velos || UK ||  || 1925 || Out of service || 16 || 
|-
| Bloch MB.175T || France ||  || 1939 || Out of service || 80 || 
|-
| Bloch MB.480 || France ||  || 1939 || Prototype || 2 || 
|-
| Blohm & Voss Ha 140 || Germany ||  || 1937 || Prototype || 3 || 
|-
| Boeing TB || US ||  || 1927 || Prototype || 3 || 
|-
| Boeing XF8B || US ||  || 1944 || Prototype || 3 || Secondary torpedo bomber role.
|-
| Borel-Odier Bo-T || France ||  || 1916 || Out of service ||  || 91 ordered, not all built
|-
| Brewster SB2A Buccaneer || US ||  || 1941 || Out of service || 771 || 
|-
| Bristol Beaufort || UK ||  || 1938 || Out of service || 2,129 || 
|-
| Bristol Beaufighter || UK ||  || 1939 || Out of service || 5,928 || Some variants only.
|-
| Bristol Brigand || UK ||  || 1944 || Out of service || 147 || 
|-
| CAC Woomera || Australia ||  || 1941 || Prototype || 2 || 
|-
| CANT Z.506B || Italy ||  || 1935 || Out of service || 324 || 
|-
| CANT Z.1007 || Italy ||  || 1937 || Out of service || 660 || 
|-
| Caproni Ca.3 || Italy ||  || 1916 || Out of service || 250-300 || 
|-
| Caproni Ca.124 || Italy ||  || 1937 || Prototype || 1 || 
|-
| Caproni Ca 314-RA || Italy ||  || 1940 || Out of service || 14 || 
|-
| Caproni Ca.316 || Italy ||  || 1940 || Out of service || 14 || 
|-
| Consolidated PBY Catalina || US ||  || 1935 || Out of service || 3,305 || 
|-
| Consolidated PB2Y Coronado || US ||  || 1937 || Out of service || 217 || 
|-
| Consolidated PB4Y-2 Privateer || US ||  || 1943 || Out of service || 739 || 
|-
| Consolidated TBY Sea Wolf || US ||  || 1941 || Out of service || 180 || 
|-
| Curtiss CS/Martin T2M || US ||  || 1923 || Out of service || 83 || 
|-
| Curtiss CT || US ||  || 1921 || Prototype || 1 || 
|-
| Curtiss R-3, R-6 & R-9 || US ||  || 1915 || Out of service || 312 || 
|-
| Curtiss XBTC || US ||  || 1945 || Prototype || 2 || 
|-
| Curtiss XBT2C || US ||  || 1945 || Prototype || 9 || 
|-
| De Havilland Mosquito || UK ||  || 1940 || Out of service || 7,781 || Number includes all types.
|-
| Dewoitine D.750 || France ||  || 1940 || Prototype || 1 || 
|-
| Dornier Do D || Germany ||  || 1924 || Out of service || 29 || 
|-
| Dornier Do 22 || Germany ||  || 1938 || Out of service || 28 || 
|-
| Dornier Do 217 || Germany ||  || 1938 ||  || || Experiments only. 
|-
| Douglas A-20 Havoc/Boston || US ||  || 1939 || Out of service || 7,478 || 
|-
| Douglas BTD Destroyer || US ||  || 1943 || Out of service || 30 || 
|-
| Douglas BT2D || US ||  || 1945 || Prototype || 1 || 
|-
| Douglas DT || US ||  || 1921 || Out of service || 90 || 
|-
| Douglas T2D || US ||  || 1927 || Out of service || 31 || 
|-
| Douglas XT3D || US ||  || 1931 || Prototype || 1 || 
|-
| Douglas TBD Devastator || US || || 1935 || Out of service || 130 || 
|-
| Douglas TB2D Skypirate || US || || 1945 || Prototype || 2 || 
|-
| Fairey Albacore || UK ||  || 1938 || Out of service || 800 || 
|-
| Fairey Barracuda || UK ||  || 1940 || Out of service || 2,572 || 
|-
| Fairey G.4/31 || UK ||  || 1934 || Prototype || 1 || 
|-
| Fairey Spearfish || UK ||  || 1945 || Prototype || 5 || 
|-
| Fairey Swordfish || UK ||  || 1934 || Out of service || 2,391 || 
|-
| Farman F.165 || France ||  || 1927 || Out of service || 40 || 
|-
| Farman F.167 || France || || 1928 || Prototype || 1 || 
|-
| Farman F.168 || France ||  || 1928 || Out of service || 200 || 
|-
| Farman F.268 || France || || 1932 || Conversion || 1 || Converted F.168.
|-
| Farman F.270 & 271 || France || || 1933 || Prototype || 1 || 
|-
| Farman F.368 || France || || 1932 || Conversion || 1 || Converted F.168.
|-
| Fiat G.55S torpedo fighter || Italy || || 1944 || Prototype || 1 || 
|-
| Fiat RS.14B || Italy ||  || 1939 || Out of service || 188 || 
|-
| Fieseler Fi 167 || Germany ||  || 1938 || Out of service || 14 || 
|-
| FMA IA-58 Pucará || Argentina || || 1969 || Prototype || 1 || Prototype tested during Falklands War.
|-
| Focke-Wulf Fw 190 A5/U14 || Germany || || 1943 || Prototype || 1 || 
|-
| Focke-Wulf Fw 190 A5/U14, F8/U2 and F8/U3 || Germany || || 1944 || Prototype || 5 || 
|-
| Focke-Wulf Fw 200 || Germany ||  || || Out of service || || 
|-
| Fokker T.II/FT || Netherlands ||  || 1921 || Prototype || 1 || 
|-
| Fokker T.III || Netherlands ||  || 1922 || Out of service || 5 || 
|-
| Fokker T.IV & IVa || Netherlands ||  || 1927 || Out of service || 42 || 
|-
| Fokker T.VIII-W, -WM, -WC & -L || Netherlands ||  || 1938 || Out of service || 49 || 
|-
| Friedrichshafen FF.35 || Germany ||  || 1916 || Prototype || 1 || 
|-
| Friedrichshafen FF.41A || Germany ||  || 1917 ||  Out of service || 9 || 
|-
| Friedrichshafen FF.53 || Germany ||  || 1918 || Out of service || 3 || 
|-
| Gloster Goring || UK ||  || 1927 || Prototype || 1 || 
|-
| Gloster TSR.38 || UK ||  || 1932 ||  Prototype || 1 || 
|-
| Gotha WD.11 || Germany ||  || 1916 || Out of service || 12 || 
|-
| Gotha WD.14 || Germany ||  || 1916 || Out of service || 69 || 
|-
| Great Lakes XTBG || US ||  || 1935 || Prototype || 1 || 
|-
| Grumman AF Guardian || US ||  || 1945 || Out of service || 389 || 
|-
| Grumman TBF Avenger || US ||  || 1941 || Out of service || 9,839 || 
|-
| Grumman XTB2F || US ||  || N/A || Design only || 0 || 
|-
| Grumman XTSF || US ||  || N/A || Design only || 0 || 
|-
| Hall XPTBH || US ||  || 1937 || Prototype || 1 || 
|-
| Handley Page H.P.31 Harrow || UK ||  || 1926 || Prototype || 2 || 
|-
| Handley Page H.P.46 || UK ||  || 1932 || Prototype || 1 || 
|-
| Handley Page H.P.47 || UK ||  || 1934 || Prototype || 1 || 
|-
| Handley Page Hampden || UK ||  || 1936 || Out of service || 1,430 || Later role 
|-
| Handley Page Hanley || UK ||  || 1922 || Prototype || 3 || 
|-
| Handley Page Hare || UK ||  || 1928 || Prototype || 1 || 
|-
| Handley Page Hendon || UK ||  || 1924 || Out of service || 6 || 
|-
| Hansa-Brandenburg GW || Germany ||  || 1916 || Out of service || c. 20 || 
|-
| Hansa-Brandenburg GDW || Germany ||  || 1916 || Prototype || 1 || 
|-
| Hawker Dantorp || UK ||  || 1932 || Prototype || 2 || 
|-
| Hawker Harrier || UK ||  || 1927 || Prototype || 1 || 
|-
| Hawker Horsley || UK ||  || 1925 || Out of service || 122 || 
|-
| Heinkel HE 7 || Germany ||  || 1927 || Prototype || 1 || 
|-
| Heinkel HD 14 || Germany ||  || 1924 || Prototype || 1 || 
|-
| Heinkel HD 16 || Germany ||  || 1928 || Out of service || 2 || 
|-
| Heinkel He 59 || Germany ||  || 1931 || Out of service || 142 || 
|-
| Heinkel He 111 J and H-5/6 || Germany ||  || 1935 || Out of service || 6,508 || Number includes all types.
|-
| Heinkel He 115 || Germany ||  || 1937 || Out of service || 138 || 
|-
| Heinkel He 177 A-3/R7 || Germany ||  || 1939 || Out of service || 1,169 ||  
|-
| Ilyushin DB-3T/Il-4T || USSR ||  || 1938 || Out of service || || 
|-
| Ilyushin Il-2T || USSR ||  || || Out of service || || 
|-
| Ilyushin Il-28T || USSR ||  || 1948 || Out of service || 6,731 || Number includes all types.
|-
| Junkers G 24/See/G 24g1e || Germany ||  || || Experimental || 1 || 
|-
| Junkers JuG-1 || Germany ||  || 1924 || Out of service || 23 || 
|-
| Junkers Ju 86K T.3 || Germany ||  || 1936 || Out of service || 16 || Swedish examples only.
|-
| Junkers Ju 87 C and D-4 || Germany ||  || || Prototype || || Experimental only.
|-
| Junkers Ju 88 A-4/Torp and A/17 || Germany ||  || || Prototype || || 
|-
| Junkers Ju 188 || Germany ||  || || Out of service || || 
|-
| Kaiser-Fleetwings XBTK || US ||  || 1945 || Prototype || 5 || 
|-
| Kawanishi H6K Mavis || Japan ||  || 1936 || Out of service || 215 || 
|-
| Kawanishi H8K Emily || Japan ||  || 1941 || Out of service || 167 || 
|-
| KEA L.33 Xelóna || Greece ||  || 1938 || Out of service || 2 ||
|-
| Latécoère 290 series || France ||  || 1931 || Out of service || 35 || 
|-
| Latécoère 298 || France ||  || 1936 || Out of service || 121 ||  
|-
| Latécoère 299 || France ||  || 1939 || Prototype  || 2 || 
|-
| Latécoère 302 || France ||  || 1931 || Prototype || 3 || 
|-
| Latécoère 440 || France ||  || 1931 || Prototype || 2 || 
|-
| Latécoère 550 || France ||  || 1933 || Prototype || 1 || 
|-
| Latécoère 582 || France ||  || 1935 || Prototype || 1 || 
|-
| Levasseur PL.2 || France ||  || 1922 || Out of service || 11 || 
|-
| Levasseur PL.7 || France ||  || 1928 || Out of service || 46 || 
|-
| Levasseur PL.14 || France ||  || 1929 || Out of service || 30 || 
|-
| Levasseur PL.15 || France ||  || 1932 || Out of service || 17 || 
|-
| Levasseur PL.107 & 108 || France ||  || 1937 || Out of service || 3 || 
|-
| Lioré et Olivier LeO H-257, 257bis & 258 || France ||  || 1928 || Out of service || 87 || 
|-
| Loire-Nieuport 10 || France ||  || 1939 || Prototype || 1 || 
|-
| Lockheed Ventura || US ||  || 1940 || Out of service || 2,475 || 
|-
| Lockheed Harpoon || US ||  || 1943 || Out of service || 535 || 
|-
| Lublin R-XX || Poland ||  || 1935 || Prototype || 1 || 
|-
| LWS-5 || Poland ||  || N/A || Design only || 0 || 
|-
| Martin AM Mauler || US ||  || 1944 || Out of service || 151 || 
|-
| Martin B-26 Marauder || US ||  || 1940 || Out of service || 5,288 || Number includes all types.
|-
| Martin BM || US ||  || 1930 || Out of service || 32 || 
|-
| Martin MBT/MT || US ||  || 1918 || Out of service || 20 || 
|-
| Martin P4M Mercator || US ||  || 1946 || Out of service || 21 || 
|-
| Martin P5M Marlin || US ||  || 1948 || Out of service || 285 || 
|-
| Martin PBM Mariner || US ||  || 1939 || Out of service || 1,285 || 
|-
| Martin T2M (SC) || US || || 1923 || Out of service || 75 || 
|-
| Martin T3M || US ||  || 1926 || Out of service || 124 || 
|-
| Martin T4M || US ||  || 1927 || Out of service || 155 || 
|-
| Martin XT6M || US ||  || 1930 || Prototype || 1 || 
|-
| Messerschmitt Me 410 B-5 || Germany ||  || 1944 || Prototype || 1 || Experiment only.
|-
| Mitsubishi 1MT || Japan ||  || 1922 || Out of service || 20 || 
|-
| Mitsubishi 3MT5 || Japan ||  || 1932 || Prototype || 11 || 
|-
| Mitsubishi 3MT10 || Japan ||  || 1932 || Prototype || 1 || 
|-
| Mitsubishi B1M || Japan ||  || 1923 || Out of service || 443 || 
|-
| Mitsubishi B2M || Japan ||  || 1929 || Out of service || 206 || 
|-
| Mitsubishi B4M || Japan ||  || 1934 || Prototype || 1 || 
|-
| Mitsubishi B5M Mabel || Japan || || 1937 || Out of service || 125 || 
|-
| Mitsubishi G3M Nell || Japan || || 1935 || Out of service  || 1,048 || 
|-
| Mitsubishi G4M Betty || Japan || || 1939 || Out of service  || 2,435 || 
|-
| Mitsubishi Ki-67 Peggy || Japan || || 1942 || Out of service  || 767 || 
|-

| Nakajima B3N || Japan ||  || 1933 || Prototype || 2 || 
|-
| Nakajima B4N || Japan ||  || 1936 || Prototype || 2 || 
|-
| Nakajima B5N Kate || Japan || || 1937 || Out of service || c. 1,150 || 
|-
| Nakajima B6N Jill || Japan ||  || 1941 || Out of service || 1,268 || 
|-
| North American B-25 Mitchell || US ||  || 1940 ||  || 9,984 || Some variants only.
|-
| Northrop N-3PB || US ||  || 1940 || Out of service || 24 || 
|-
| Parnall G.4/31 || UK ||  || 1934 || Prototype || 1 || 
|-
| Piaggio P.108 || Italy ||  || 1939 || Out of service || 24 || Secondary role
|-
| PZL 18 || Poland ||  || N/A || Design only || 0 || 
|-
| Reggiane Re.2001G/H torpedo fighter || Italy || Variant || 1940 || Out of service || 2 || 
|-
| Reggiane Re.2002 torpedo fighter || Italy ||  || 1940 || Prototype || 1 || For trials.
|-
| RWD 22 || Poland ||  || N/A || Design only || 0 || 
|-
| SAAB T 18B || Sweden ||  || 1942 || Out of service || 52 || Torpedo bomber used for ground attack.
|-
| Savoia-Marchetti S.55 || Italy ||  || 1924 || Out of service || 212 || 
|-
| Savoia-Marchetti SM.79 Sparviero || Italy ||  || 1934 || Out of service || 1,350 ||  
|-
| Savoia-Marchetti SM.81 || Italy ||  || 1934 || Out of service || 535 || For trials.
|-
| Savoia-Marchetti SM.84 || Italy ||  || 1940 || Out of service || 309 || 
|-
| Savoia-Marchetti SM.93 || Italy ||  || 1944 || Prototype || 1 || 
|-
| Short Shirl || UK ||  || 1918 || Prototype || 4 || 
|-
| Short Sturgeon S.1 & S.B.3 || UK ||  || 1946 || Prototype || 4 || 
|-
| Short Type 81 || UK ||  || 1913 || Out of service || 9 || 
|-
| Short Type 166 || UK ||  || 1916 || Out of service || 26 || 
|-
| Short Type 184 || UK ||  || 1915 || Out of service || 936 || First torpedo bomber to sink a ship.
|-
| Short Type 310/320 || UK ||  || 1916 || Out of service || 127 || 
|-
| SNCAC NC.4-10 || France ||  || 1939 || Prototype || 1 || 
|-
| SNCAC NC.1070 || France ||  || 1947 || Prototype || 1 || 
|-
| SNCAO CAO.600 || France ||  || 1940 || Prototype || 1 || 
|-
| Sopwith Cuckoo || UK ||  || 1917 || Out of service || 232 || First purpose-built carrier-based torpedo bomber.
|-
| Sopwith Special torpedo seaplane Type C || UK ||  || 1914 || Prototype || 1 || 
|-
| Sopwith Type 860 || UK ||  || 1914 || Out of service || 22 || 
|-
| Stout ST || US ||  || 1922 || Prototype || 3 || 
|-
| Supermarine Nanok || UK ||  || 1927 || Prototype || 1 || 
|-
| Supermarine Type 322 || UK ||  || 1943 || Prototype || 2 || 
|-
| Tupolev ANT-7 (MR-6) || USSR ||  || 1930 || Out of service || 411 || Number includes all variants.
|-
| Tupolev ANT-22 || USSR ||  || 1934 || Prototype || 1 || 
|-
| Tupolev ANT-41 (T-1) || USSR ||  || 1936 || Prototype || 1 || 
|-
| KR-6T || USSR ||  || || Prototype || 1 || 
|-
| Tupolev TB-1 || USSR ||  || 1925 || Out of service || 218 || 
|-
| Tupolev Tu-2T (ANT-62T) || USSR ||  || || Out of service || || 
|-
| Tupolev Tu-14 || USSR ||  || 1949 || Out of service || 89 || 
|-
| Tupolev Tu-91 || USSR ||  || 1955 || Prototype || 1 || 
|-
| Vickers Type 207 || UK ||  || 1933 || Prototype || 1 || 
|-
| Vickers Type 253 || UK ||  || 1934 || Prototype || 1 || 
|-
| Vickers Vildebeest || UK ||  || 1928 || Out of service || 209 || 
|-
| Vickers Vimy || UK ||  || 1918 || Out of service || 1 || Trials.
|-
| Vickers Wellesley || UK ||  || 1935 || Out of service || 177 || Role dropped following drop tests.
|-
| Vickers Wellington || UK ||  || 1936 || Out of service || 11,461 || Number includes all types.
|-
| Westland PV-3 || UK ||  || 1931 || Prototype || 1 || Role dropped.
|-
| Westland PV.7 || UK ||  || 1933 ||  Prototype || 1 || 
|-
| Westland Witch || UK ||  || 1928 || Prototype || 1 || 
|-
| Westland Wyvern || UK ||  || 1946 || Out of service || 127 || 
|-
| Wight Twin || UK ||  || 1915 || Out of service || 4 || 
|-
| Yokosuka experimental twin-engined seaplane || Japan || || 1916 || Experimental || 1 || 
|-
| Yokosuka B3Y || Japan ||  || 1933 || Out of service || 129 || 
|-
| Yokosuka B4Y Jean || Japan || || 1935 || Out of service || 205 || 
|-
| Yokosuka P1Y Frances || Japan || || 1943 || Out of service || 1,102 ||  
|}

See also
List of bomber aircraft
List of maritime patrol aircraft

References

Sources
 
 

 

 
 
 
 

 
 *

Lists of aircraft by role
Lists of military aircraft